Altofts and Whitwood is an electoral ward of the City of Wakefield district used for elections to Wakefield Metropolitan District Council.

Overview 
The ward is one of 21 in the Wakefield district, and has been held by Labour since the current boundaries were formed for the 2004 Council election. As of 2015, the electorate stands at 12,495 of which 96.1% identify as "White British" and 67.5% of who identify as Christian.

The ward comprises Altofts, Whitwood and Whitwood Mere, and a number of industrial parks that occupy much of the land between Normanton and Castleford. The ward also includes the Cutsyke, Roundhill and Half Acres areas of Castleford. To the north the ward is bounded by the River Calder. The ward is bisected by the M62 and has the Trans Pennine Trail running through it.

Representation 
Like all wards in the Wakefield district, Altofts and Whitwood has 3 councillors, whom are elected on a 4-year-rota. This means elections for new councillors are held for three years running, with one year every four years having no elections.

The current councillors are Jo Hepworth and Jacquie Speight both of whom are Labour. There are only currently two councillors due to the resignation of Peter Box  who served as Leader of Wakefield Council for 21 years.

Councillors

Election results

Notes

References 

Wards of Wakefield